The 2017 Egypt Cup Final was the 85th final of the Egypt Cup, Africa's oldest football cup competition. It was played on 15 August 2017 at Borg El Arab Stadium in Alexandria and was contested between Al Ahly and Al Masry. The winners would have entered the 2018 CAF Confederation Cup had they not already qualified. However, since Al Ahly already qualified for the 2018 CAF Champions League, the Confederation Cup entry went to Al Masry, as they reached the Cup final.

This was the 7th time the two teams meet each other in the final, having played before in 1927, 1945, 1947, 1983, 1984 and 1989.

The match was broadcast live in Egypt by dmc Sports, Nile Sport and ON Sport. All channels provided the free-to-air coverage.

Route to the final

Al Ahly

Al Masry

Pre-match

Details

References 

Egypt Cup Final
2017
Final
Al Ahly SC matches
Al-Masry SC matches